Hello My Dear Wrong Number is a 1986 Indian Malayalam-language comedy thriller film directed by Priyadarshan and written by Sreenivasan from a story by Priyadarshan. It was inspired from North By Northwest directed by Alfred Hitchcock.stars Mohanlal, Maniyanpilla Raju, Jagathy Sreekumar, Lissy and Menaka, with Mukesh in a guest appearance.

Plot
Venugopal is a medical representative, an innocent young man who likes being around women and boasting about him  to impress them.
One day after his job, he decided to watch a movie and while heading towards the theatre in a taxi, a beautiful young lady stops the car and requests him to drop her at a nearby hotel. Enchanted by the beauty of the girl, he agrees to drop her as well as agree to post a letter she wrote on the way. Since the lady looked perplexed and confused and in a hurry there wasn't much of a conversation taking place even though Venugopal tries hard.

Later he goes to the movie and walks into the restroom during the break and gets badly beaten up by certain goons demanding the “letter“ and takes him to the boss's place where he is asked to reveal the address, the letter was posted to. Venugopal fails to give an answer, as he doesn't even remember the address.

Next day he goes to the guy's place with Minnal Babu, a police officer to lodge a complaint and is shocked to see that the entire chain of events is manipulated against him. He rushes to the hotel where he had dropped the lady the other day to find what's going on, only find her dead body falling on him as he opens the room door.

Then starts the game where he is framed for crimes he hasn't committed.

Cast 

 Mohanlal as Venugopal, medical representative
 Lissy as Sunitha Menon / Annie Abraham, Venugopal's love interest
 Maniyanpilla Raju as Ramadasan
 Menaka as Shobha, Venugopal's sister
 Jagannatha Varma as Udayavarma, diamond merchant
 C. I. Paul as Police Commissioner Sathyanathan
 Jagathi Sreekumar as Minnal Babu, Crime Branch DySP
 Sreenath as SI Rajagopal, police Sub-Inspector
 Mukesh as Jacob, a murdered diamond thief
 Ragini as Sridevi, Jacob's accomplice and lover
 Captain Raju as David Antony Fernandez, criminal mastermind
 Sreenivasan as Priest Andrews
 Sankaradi as Judge Narayanan Kurup
 James as Chacko
 Sukumari as Forensic officer
 Bob Christo as Roger, David Antony Fernandez's assistant
 Shivaji as Jayan
 Zeenath
 Kothuku Nanappan as Hypnotherapist
 Sulakshana
 Disco Shanti
 Fazil (Cameo appearance)
 P.A Latheef

Soundtrack
The music was composed by Raghu Kumar and the lyrics were written by S. Ramesan Nair.

References

External links
 

1980s Malayalam-language films
Films with screenplays by Sreenivasan
Films directed by Priyadarshan
Indian remakes of American films
Films shot in Thiruvananthapuram
Films scored by Raghu Kumar